Diocese of Limerick may refer to:

Diocese of Limerick and Killaloe
Roman Catholic Diocese of Limerick